Communist Unification (KS) was a communist organisation in Denmark. It was founded in November 2005, following a split from the Communist Party in Denmark. It claimed 42 members at the time of its foundation.

In November 2006, KS merged with Communist Party of Denmark (Marxist-Leninist) and formed the Communist Party. At the time of the dissolution of KS, the organisation claimed to have 85 members.

References

2005 establishments in Denmark
2006 disestablishments in Denmark
Defunct communist parties in Denmark
Political parties established in 2005
Political parties disestablished in 2006